Historical earthquakes is a list of significant earthquakes known to have occurred prior to the beginning of the 20th century. As the events listed here occurred before routine instrumental recordings, they rely mainly on the analysis of written sources or using stone/wooden poles or vessels filled with water. There is often significant uncertainty in location and magnitude and sometimes date for each earthquake. The number of fatalities is also often highly uncertain, particularly for the older events.

Pre-11th century

11th–17th centuries

18th century

19th century

Source for all events with 'USGS' labelled as the source United States Geological Survey (USGS) 
Note: Magnitudes are generally estimations from intensity data. When no magnitude was available, the maximum intensity, written as a Roman numeral from I to XII, is given.

See also
 :Category:Articles on pre-1900 earthquakes
 Lists of 20th-century earthquakes
 Lists of 21st-century earthquakes
 List of tsunamis
 Lists of earthquakes
 List of megathrust earthquakes

References

External links
Southern California Earthquake Center (SCEC)
Earthquakes Canada
Historical earthquakes in Europe
IRIS Seismic Monitor, Recent earthquakes around the world
Recent New Zealand earthquakes
SeismoArchives, Seismogram Archives of Significant Earthquakes of the World
USGS list of current earthquakes
USGS list of earthquakes magnitude 6.0 and greater sorted by magnitude
Global Significant Earthquake Database, 2150 BC to present – National Geophysical Data Center
Database for the damage of world earthquake, ancient period (3000 BC) to year of 2006 – Building Research Institute (Japan)

Historical earthquakes
Seismic history